Omar Gassama is a Gambian politician. He is a member of the African Union's Economic, Social and Cultural Council, representing West Africa.

References

Economic, Social and Cultural Council Standing Committee members
Gambian politicians
Living people
Year of birth missing (living people)
Place of birth missing (living people)